Dogs in Space is an animated action-adventure streaming television series created by Jeremiah Cortez and developed by Cortez, James Hamilton and Adam Henry for Netflix. Produced by GrizzlyJerr Productions and Netflix Animation, with animation provided by Atomic Cartoons, the series premiered on November 18, 2021.

Synopsis 
In the not-so-distant future, genetically enhanced dogs are sent across the universe in search of a new home for the human race. It's a giant cosmic game of fetch, as the canines seek a planet that will save humanity and more importantly let them return to their beloved owners.

Voice cast

Crew of Pluto
 Haley Joel Osment as Garbage, an impulsive corgi who serves as the main captain of the Pluto in Season 1 who is determined to find a new home for humanity. He briefly serves as a crew member of the team in Season 2 after being demoted in the end of that season. And eventually becoming co-captain with Stella at the end of the Season.
 Gracen Newton as Puppy Garbage
 Sarah Chalke as Stella, a sensible Sheltie who serves as tactical officer of the Pluto until the end of Season 1, where she is later promoted to become captain of the Pluto at the end and later on in the rest of the Season.
 Kimiko Glenn as Nomi, a shih tzu who serves as the brash, excitable pilot of the Pluto.
 Sophie Jean Wu as Puppy Nomi
 Chris Parnell as Ed, a Jack Russell terrier kleptomaniac who serves as an "ambassador" of the Pluto.
 Dawson Griffen as Puppy Ed
 David Lopez as Chonies, a chihuahua who is the Pluto'''s med/tech officer and a yes-man.
 Dylan Alvarado as Puppy Chonies
 William Jackson Harper as Loaf, a nervous bulldog surveillance officer who helps the crew from the M-Bark.
 Debra Wilson as Kira, a canadian eskimo dog who was sent to space by P.R.A.T.S in order to find humanity a new home to settle in and was stranded on an unknown planet until Garbage and his crew found her and rescued her. After being stranded and abandoned there for a very long period of time has led her to have insane problematic issues trusting humans, which led to her to betray the crew and taking over the M-Bark in order to get away from humanity, until Garbage convinced her that she wasn’t abandoned by her owner and neither is P.R.A.T.S which eventually led her to feel regretfully remorseful of her actions which has resulted her in regaining her trust with humans as well as reconcile and make amends and with the crew of the Pluto and M-Bark. She currently lives on Earth with her owner and having conversations with Garbage's owner.
 Duchess, a St. Bernard who is a member of the Council
 Nova Reed as Puppy Kira 
 Stephanie Beatriz as Pepper, a black Labrador Retriever who serves as the new member of the Pluto as their new tactical officer in Season 2, and was a former member of Neptune.

Recurring
 JP Karliak as Happy, a poodle serving as the captain of Venus and a member of the Council who antagonizes Garbage, and eventually make amends with him later on in Season 2.
 Bucky
 Luke, a security guard on the M-Bark
 Bernie
 Barclay, a manager of coffee shop.
 Magnificent Chipolata
 Michael Dorn as Pistachio Soup, a Sharpei who is  the head of the Council.
 John DiMaggio as Jerry, a Chow Chow security guard on the M-Bark.
 Gen. Huntrods, a human general of P.R.A.T.S on earth who's part of the program that sends dogs to space to find humanity a new home
 Stardust, a Scottish Terrier, who was the former captain of the Pluto
 Beetle
 Fran
 Gary
 Vyvy Nguyen as Dr. Chelsea, Garbage's human who is a scientist back on Earth.
 Deedee Magno Hall as Penelope, a Tibetan Spaniel who is the M-Bark's dog trainer and once a prize-winning show dog.
 Elder Shrubdub, the caretaker of the planting
 Rena Strober as Dr. Olga, the human head scientist of the program and Kira's owner.
 Luna, a member of the Council
 Maple, a member of the Council
 Sophie, a member of Jupiter
 Wil Wheaton as Atlas, a Boston Terrier who is the med/tech officer of Venus.

Guest stars
 Bobby Moynihan as Gooey ("Who's a Good Boy?")
 Andrew Kishino as Cy-bark ("Watch Me" and "Mistaken Id-ED-ity")
 Robin Atkin Downes as Captain Surgill ("Who Wants a Treaty?")
 Kate Mulgrew as Mavis ("Mistaken Id-ED-ity")
 Becky Poole as Captain Tontun ("Let There Be Loaf")
 Yvette Nicole Brown as Captain Clawdia ("Barking Up the Wrong Tree")

Episodes

Season 1 (2021)

Season 2 (2022)

Production
The series was first announced in June 2021.

In November 2021, Netflix renewed the series for a second season.

Release
The first season of Dogs in Space'' was released on November 18, 2021, on Netflix. A trailer was released on October 19. The second season was released on September 15, 2022.

References

External links

2021 American television series debuts
2021 Canadian television series debuts
2020s American animated television series
2020s Canadian animated television series
American children's animated action television series
American children's animated space adventure television series
Canadian children's animated action television series
Canadian children's animated space adventure television series
Animated television series about dogs
Animated television series by Netflix
English-language Netflix original programming
Netflix children's programming
Television series by Netflix Animation
Television series set on fictional planets
Animals in space